Newsies (released as The News Boys in the United Kingdom) is a 1992 American historical musical comedy-drama film produced by Walt Disney Pictures and directed by choreographer Kenny Ortega in his film directing debut. Loosely based on the New York City Newsboys' Strike of 1899 and featuring twelve original songs by Alan Menken with lyrics by Jack Feldman and an underscore by J. A. C. Redford, it stars Christian Bale, Bill Pullman, Ann-Margret, and Robert Duvall.

The film was an initial box office bomb, and received mixed reviews at the time of its release. However, it later gained a cult following on home video, and was ultimately adapted into a stage musical on Broadway. The play was nominated for eight Tony Awards, winning two including Best Original Score for Menken and Feldman.

Plot
In 1899, 17-year-old Jack "Cowboy" Kelly is one of many struggling newspaper hawkers in New York City, selling copies of the New York World on the streets of Manhattan ("Carrying the Banner"). When David Jacobs and his younger brother Les join the "newsies," Jack notices David's intelligence and Les's marketable cuteness and self-servingly takes them under his wing. Unlike most of the newsies, David and Les are not orphans or runaways; they have a home and family, and go to work in order to help their family get back on their feet financially, as their father was fired from his factory job due to an injury. Jack is invited to the Jacobs' home for dinner, where he becomes enamored with their sister Sarah. Later, Jack laments his isolation due to lacking a family of his own; he fantasizes about traveling to New Mexico, about which he has heard many romantic stories ("Santa Fe"). 
 
Attempting to outdo his business rival William Randolph Hearst, New York World publisher Joseph Pulitzer raises the prices that the newsies must pay to buy newspapers from his distribution centers. Angered, Jack and David galvanize the other Manhattan newsies to go on strike ("The World Will Know"). While the others spread the word to newsies in New York's other boroughs, Jack and Les confront Pulitzer and are thrown out of his office. Bryan Denton, a reporter for The Sun, takes an interest in the boys' story. Jack and David take their cause to the Brooklyn newsies, but their leader, "Spot" Conlon, is reluctant to join the strike. This dejects the Manhattan newsies, but David riles them up ("Seize the Day"). As a result, they ambush the distribution center and destroy all of the newspapers. Disabled newsie "Crutchie" is captured by Pulitzer's enforcers, the Delancey brothers, and placed in an orphanage and juvenile detention center called the Refuge, run by the sketchy Warden Snyder, who neglects the orphans so that he can embezzle money given to him by the city for their care.

The newsies try to ward off strikebreakers, but the struggle turns violent and turns out to be a trap set by the Delancey brothers. Just as the newsies are about to be arrested, Spot Conlon arrives with the Brooklyn newsies and the two groups unite to repel the police. Denton puts the story on the front page of The Sun. Thrilled, the newsies all rejoice at making the headline and imagine what it would be like to be famous ("King of New York"). They then plan to hold a rally. Snyder informs Pulitzer that Jack is an escapee from the Refuge, giving Pulitzer legal cause to have him arrested. Jack has breakfast with Sarah on the roof of the Jacobs' apartment building; he tells her of his desire to flee to Santa Fe, and wonders if she would miss him.

Newsies from around New York gather at Medda Larkson's Bowery. Jack, David, and Spot give speeches, encouraging the newsies to stick together and not give up on their cause. Before they all go back to their own boroughs, Medda cheers them up with a song ("High Times, Hard Times"). The police then break up the rally and arrest the newsies, but Denton steps in to pay their legal fines. Snyder testifies against Jack and reveals to the others that Jack's real name is Francis Sullivan; his mother is deceased and his father incarcerated. Jack is sentenced to four years of rehabilitation in the Refuge. Denton is reassigned as a war correspondent and can no longer report on the strike. Jack is taken to see Pulitzer, who offers to waive his sentence and pay him a salary if he will work as a strikebreaker. When Pulitzer threatens to have the other newsies thrown into the Refuge, Jack complies. The boys attempt to rescue Jack, but he tells them to leave.

The newsies are shocked and dismayed to see Jack report for work the next day. When the Delanceys attack the Jacobs children, Jack steps in to save them, despite knowing this will break his deal with Pulitzer. The newsies learn from Denton that their strike has had little effect on public opinion, since the city thrives on child labor and Pulitzer has ordered newspapers not to report on the strike. Using an old printing press of Pulitzer's, they publish a "Newsie Banner" which they distribute to child workers citywide ("Once and For All"). Denton shares the paper with Governor Theodore Roosevelt, exposing the mistreatment of children at the Refuge. Numerous child laborers join the strike, bringing the city's workforce to a standstill. Jack and David confront Pulitzer, who finally gives in to their demands.

Roosevelt has Snyder arrested, releases the children from the Refuge, and thanks Jack for alerting him to the situation. He offers Jack a ride, and Jack asks to be taken to the train yards so he can head to Santa Fe. The newsies are disheartened by this, but Jack returns shortly, having been convinced by Roosevelt that he still has things to accomplish in New York. As the newsies celebrate his return, Sarah and Jack kiss, and Spot gets a ride back to Brooklyn from Roosevelt.

Cast

Production
Walt Disney Pictures tapped its film financing partner, Touchwood Pacific Partners, to fund the production of the film. The production had a $15 million budget. Alan Menken's longtime collaborator, Howard Ashman, was too sick from AIDS to work with Menken on this film, and he would eventually die on March 14, 1991. Menken brought in lyricist Jack Feldman to help.

Music

Release
Newsies was released on April 10, 1992, via distributor Buena Vista Pictures. The film did not recoup its $15 million budget, making less than a fifth of that at the box office. Newsies has since gained a measurable fan base.

In 1992, the film was released on Walt Disney Home Video, while a collector's edition DVD was released in 2002. Walt Disney Studios Home Entertainment released the film on Blu-ray, as a 20th Anniversary Edition, on June 19, 2012.

Reception

Critical response
On Rotten Tomatoes, the film's average score is 39% based on 38 reviews, with an average rating of 5/10. The critical consensus reads: "Extra! Extra! Read all about Newsies instead of suffering through its underwhelming musical interludes, although Christian Bale makes for a spirited hero." On Metacritic, the film has a weighted average score of 46 out of 100, based on 19 critics, indicating "mixed or average reviews". Film critic and historian Leonard Maltin called it Howard the Paperboy, noting "This ambitious (up to a point) project is done in by a lackluster score, and by cramped production numbers that seem cheap despite the movie's hefty production budget -- not to mention its bloated running time."

Box office
The film grossed $2,819,485 domestically. The film did not recoup its $15 million budget, making less than a fifth of that at the box office. It also ranks among the lowest-grossing live-action films produced by the Walt Disney Studios. This is due to the film being pulled from many theaters after a poor opening weekend.

Accolades

Historical accuracy

The actual newsboys' strike of 1899 lasted from July 20 to August 2. The leader of the strike was a one-eyed young man named Louis Balletti, nicknamed "Kid Blink", who spoke with a heavy Brooklyn accent that was often phonetically transcribed when he was quoted by newspapers. Kid Blink is featured in the film as a minor supporting character, while the role of strike leader is given to the fictional Jack "Cowboy" Kelly. Kid Blink and another real-life newsie, Morris Cohen, were the inspiration for Kelly. The actual strike ended with a compromise: the World and Journal agreed to buy back all unsold copies of the newspapers.

Stage adaptation

Disney Theatrical Productions produced a stage musical based on the film that played at the Paper Mill Playhouse in Millburn, New Jersey, starting on September 25, 2011, through October 16, starring Jeremy Jordan as Jack. Newsies!: The Musical contains songs from the film, as well as several new numbers.

The musical opened to previews on Broadway at the Nederlander Theatre for a limited engagement from March 15, 2012, to March 28, 2012, in previews and from March 29, 2012, to June 10, 2012, in its official engagement. This was later extended through August 19, 2012, after the first weekend of previews and then extended again, this time to an open-ended run. The show went on to earn eight Tony Award nominations, including Best Musical, winning Best Choreography and Best Original Score. The show closed on August 24, 2014, having played 1,004 performances.

References

Notes

External links

 
 
 
 Film stills

1992 films
1990s musical comedy-drama films
1990s musical films
American musical comedy-drama films
1990s English-language films
Cultural depictions of Theodore Roosevelt
Films directed by Kenny Ortega
Films about orphans
Films about the labor movement
Films about the media
Comedy-drama films based on actual events
Films set in 1899
Films set in New York City
Films set in New York (state)
Films adapted into plays
Musical films based on actual events
Walt Disney Pictures films
Walt Disney Records soundtracks
Films scored by Alan Menken
Films scored by J. A. C. Redford
1992 directorial debut films
1992 comedy-drama films
Films with screenplays by Noni White
Films with screenplays by Bob Tzudiker
American children's comedy films
American children's drama films
Golden Raspberry Award winning films
American children's musical films
1990s American films